Kevin Soucie (born February 2, 1954) is a former member of the Wisconsin State Assembly.

Biography
Soucie was born on February 2, 1954, in Milwaukee, Wisconsin. He graduated from Alexander Hamilton High School before attending the University of Wisconsin–Madison and the University of Wisconsin–Milwaukee.

Career
Soucie was elected to the Assembly in 1974. He is a Democrat.

References

Politicians from Milwaukee
Democratic Party members of the Wisconsin State Assembly
University of Wisconsin–Madison alumni
University of Wisconsin–Milwaukee alumni
1954 births
Living people